The Five Glens of Angus are the five Highland glens located in the western portion of the Angus region of Scotland.  The five glens from westernmost to easternmost are:

Glen Isla
Glen Prosen
Glen Clova
Glen Lethnot
Glen Esk

Glen Clova is remarkable for its glaciated landscape, with the deep trough-heads of Glen Doll and Corrie Fee, an array of classic corries (glacial cirques) along its NE rim - notably Corrie Bonhard, Corrie of Clova, Corrie Brandy and Corrie Wharrel, and a cluster of diverse "rock slope failures" (rock slides, avalanches, and deformations) including The Rives on Cairn Broadlands, and several in the corries 

Glen Clova's 1940s postwoman, Jean Cameron, changed the uniform for women, having asked to wear trousers for her rounds, they were named 'Camerons' after her.

In 2015 red kites at the Gannochy estate in Glenesk were found to have been stealing swimmers' clothing to line their nest.

See also
 Kilry Glen

References

External links
Angus Glens Ranger Service

Glens of Scotland
Landforms of Angus, Scotland